Brandon Yosha (born May 26, 1993) is an American trial lawyer and former American Football running back for the Miami Hurricanes and Lehigh University Mountain Hawks.

High school years 
Yosha grew up in Carmel, Indiana where he attended and starred for Cathedral High School from 2009 to 2012. During his Junior year, Yosha was ranked as the No. 7 running back in the nation, according to Rivals.com. He suffered a right knee ACL tear, forcing him to miss the remainder of his Junior campaign. He committed to play Division 1 American Football at the University of Miami.

College years 
Yosha started his collegiate football career at the University of Miami in the 2012 season, where he played both running back and special teams. He went on to letter during his freshman year recording his first snap versus Kansas State & recording his first tackle against NC State.

Following his freshman year, Yosha transferred to Lehigh University in order to pursue a larger role in the offense. He began the season as the starting tailback for the Mountain Hawks, experiencing initial success early on in the season. He recorded 70 first-quarter yards, including a score on the first possession before tearing his lateral meniscus vs Yale. His season ended with 60 carries for 318 yards and 4 touchdowns, along with 23 yards receiving.

After suffering multiple injuries to his knees, Yosha left football to pursue a career in law. He moved back to his hometown of Indianapolis and transferred to Indiana University.

Professional career 
Since graduating from Law School, Yosha became a junior partner at Yosha, Cook & Tisch – Personal Injury Lawyer, his father's established law firm in 2020. He has seen success early on in his legal career, receiving recognition for his role in securing a $20 million verdict against Indianapolis Power & Light Co. where he performed the opening statement, final argument, and direct examination.

References 

1993 births
Living people
Miami Hurricanes football players
Lehigh Mountain Hawks football players
American football running backs
People from Carmel, Indiana
Sportspeople from Indiana
Indiana University alumni